The Cathedral of the Consolata, also called the Roman Catholic Cathedral of Tehran, is a Catholic Church building in the city of Tehran, Iran, in which the Latin or Roman rite is followed. It is not to be confused with the Chaldean Catholic cathedral of Tehran, St. Joseph's Cathedral, where the Chaldean rite is followed.

The cathedral is located near the Italian embassy in Tehran. It is the main church of the Roman Catholic Archdiocese of Teheran-Isfahan (Archidioecesis Teheranensis-Hispahanensis Latinorum), which was created in 1629 by Pope Urban VIII.

It is under the pastoral responsibility of Bishop Dominique Mathieu, O.F.M. Conv. Due to the diversity of nationalities of Christians in the city, it offers religious services in various languages.

See also
Catholic Church in Iran
Santuario della Consolata

References

Roman Catholic cathedrals in Iran
Cathedrals in Tehran